Magrane may refer to:

Magrane (surname), including a list of people with the name
Magrane District, a district of El Oued Province, Algeria
Magrane, Algeria, a town and commune, capital of the district
Magrane, Chad, a town and prefecture in Chad